Kalari Panicker / Kalari Kurup is an ethnic group belonging to the Hindu religion, who live in the South Malabar and central parts of the Indian state of Kerala.  They were well known as the masters of Kalari tradition, having their Nalpatheeradi Kalari (a name derived from its area of 42 x 21 feet). They are the people who propagated and practiced Kalaripayattu, the martial art form of Kerala. The National Commission of Backward Classes lists Kalari Kurup or Kalari Panicker under the list of OBCs. The titles Panicker and Kurup are prevalent in several other communities in Kerala, e.g. Illathu or Kiriyathil Panicker who belong to the Nair community, and should not be confused with Kalari Panicker or Kalari Kurup.

History 

Kalaris in Kerala were established during different periods of time. The formation of Kerala is interlinked to the story of Parashurama. It is believed that Parashurama established 108 kalaris across Kerala. Several kalaris were established during the reign of Kulasekharas. In the 12th century towards the end of Perumal era, the present state of Kerala was divided into small autonomous provinces called Nadus and ruled by its own Kings. During the Kulasekhara rule and later the kings of Nadus brought in warriors from Tulu Nadu. The Purananuru poems mentions about such warriors. These warriors known as Nambi Kurup were helped by the kings to settle in Kerala by granting them land and wealth to maintain and upkeep kalaris. They used the martial arts mastery of the Nambi Kurup to settle their disputes and hence, existence of kalaris became prevalent.

Kalari Panicker or Kalari Kurup are descendants of those Aacharyas or masters migrated from Tulu Nadu. The resting stone (Athani or Chumaduthangi in Malayalam) found in Valluvally village of Ernakulam district bearing the engraved remarks on stone “Kalarikkal Nambi Kurup”, must be regarded as conduit connecting the findings of history. The book by Edgar Thurston also discusses that a community by name Nambi Kurup lived in Northern part of Cochin kingdom.

The community which based on its traditional occupation around Kalari, were given the title Kurup or Panicker by the Kings and villagers and later came to be known as Kalari Kurup or Kalari Panicker.

Traditional Occupation

Fencing Masters 
The Kalari is an institution formed to train the youth in martial arts with the use of weapons. These kalaris which are 42 feet in length and 21 feet in breadth were called Nalpatheeradi kalari. Masters from Kalari Kurup / Kalari Panicker community used to teach Kalaripayattu to the Ezhava and Nair communities and consistently practised the same in central Kerala.
Kerala was a place where kings of small autonomous provinces had an independent army and Kalari Kurup / Kalari Panicker were employed by these kings to train and maintain their army. Disputes between the kings and landlords were also settled through fencing competition administered by Kalari Gurukkal.

Astrology 
In the medieval period and later, astrology existed and was practised in Kerala. In central Kerala the same was dealt by Kalari Kurup / Kalari Panicker along with other major occupations.

Following the recommendations of Lord Richards, the British Administration in 1804 abolished the practice of martial arts and using weaponry in Kerala. As a result of this, Naalpatheeradi Kalaris were transformed into family temples. When the Kalari institutions were forcefully closed by the implementation of law, many Kalari masters adopted astrology as their occupation. Since then, the community has seen several scholars in astrology. L K Anantha Krishna Iyer in his book, The Cochin Tribes and Castes mentions, "After Nairs and other caste-men ceased to be soldiers, their occupation was chiefly confined to the training of young men in athletic sports and in dramatic performances, in addition to their profession of astrology. Gradually the former was less cared for, and astrology became their chief occupation."

Ayurveda and Marma Therapy 
During Kalaripayattu training and during wars, Kalaris offered Kalari Marma treatment. Kalari Gurukkal (Kalari Masters) were specially trained in administering these traditional treatments. They were also identified for their proficiency in ayurvedic medicines.

More complex forms of marma treatment which give agility, flexibility and suppleness of the body through massage or Uzhichil were performed by the masters.

Imparting education 

Masters from Kalari Panicker community were also involved in providing preliminary education (read and write) to their students. The women also used to teach children living in their villages. After their students complete their preliminary learning of alphabets and vernacular phonetics, the students could seek higher education and further expand their knowledge base in Sanskrit, critical evaluation and astrology.

Art 
Pitichu Kali, Parishathalam Kali, Kolati were the folklore of Nair and few other communities. These folklore songs and dance steps were directed and trained by Kalari Panicker community. Later in the years that followed, these unique folklore mixed with the contemporary folk songs of Kerala and lost its identity.

Dwelling 
The Masters of Naalpatheeradi Kalari registered their presence in Kerala and were present at geographical limits between south of Korapuzha and north of Aluva Puzha (Tributary of Periyar river) comprising the South Malabar area, the present Palakkad, Thrissur and some parts of Ernakulam district coming under the Cochin Province.

Culture

Customs and Tradition 
The customs and religious traditions followed throughout the length and breadth of Kerala is similar in nature and derives its base from the Arya-Dravida culture and religious traditions. The Kalaris were a unification of temple of worship and ground for training in martial arts. The structure and design of Kalari and the Devi or Goddess deities of the Temple is an indication of the Arya-Dravida influence in their tradition.

Masters from Kalari Panicker community usually established their Kalari near the south west corner of their residence (Tharavadu). The Kalari typically has idols of Kalari Gods - the deities of War and the idols of great forefathers and Aacharyas. Inside the Kalari premises a separate premise is designated to pay respects and prayers to the forefathers and the founders of the Kalari. This method of making idols of forefathers (founders of the Kalaris) as Guru Tharas is unique and makes this community distinct from most other castes in India.

Beside the Kalari, there also exists a Naga Kaavu or Sarpa Kavu where serpent Gods are worshiped. The Pulluvan or Velan community were under special privileges with rights to perform rituals in these Kavu.

Attire 
Dressing style adopted by Kalari Panicker community was similar to that of the Nair in the Society. They used to wear mundu, a piece of white long cloth, fastened to their waist and also used to wear Randam Mundu, a similar small cloth which is folded neatly and put on the shoulder. They used to put sandal paste on the forehead, tighten their lengthy hair to a Kuduma and welcome the mornings with devotional Sanskrit chants. There was a society-imposed restriction that people of lower castes were not allowed to adorn or carry an umbrella made of palm leaves while on a journey. Since Kalari Panicker were masters to Savarna or upper castes, they were allowed to use the palm leaves' umbrellas.

Social Status 
K P Padmanabha Menon in his History of Kerala describes special teachers imparting instruction in fencing, known as Panickers in South Malabar, and Paravans in Northern district and socially occupy an intermediate position between the Nairs and Ezhava.

L K Anantha Krishna Iyer in his book, The Cochin Tribes and Castes, observed that Nair soldiers would follow the marriage procession of Kalari Panicker till the limits of the Desham or Province, armed with weapons as a mark of respect.

Following the abolition of Kalaripayattu in Kerala under the British rule, the community experienced a sudden downfall in their economic status.  Today it is listed under the Other Backward Class as published by the Government of Kerala.

Differentiation from similar castes 
L K Anantha Krishna Iyer mentions Kalari Panicker under the Kaniyar section in the book, The Cochin Tribes and Castes. However regarding combining the two, he mentions the following in the book, "there is some difference in the social status between the Kaniyans of the South and the Kalari Panikkans of the northern parts of the State. The latter, as has been mentioned, profess a kind of superiority in status to the former on the following grounds, namely, that the former have no Kalaris which, as I have mentioned now, imply preceptor-ship to the Nairs, who take part in their ceremonies and receive their blessings. It is also said by the latter, that the occupation of the former was once that of umbrella-making and that astrology as a profession has been recently adopted by them. There is at present neither intermarriage nor inter-dining between them. The Kaniyans pollute the Kalari Panikkans by touch. My own investigations lead me to believe that they are one and the same people, the difference in the social status being probably due to the absence of association owing to distance and local environments."

The major similarity between Kalari Panicker and Kaniyar is related to their occupation of astrology, which the Kalari Panicker seems to have adopted more towards the beginning of 19th century. All customs and traditions of the Kalari Panicker are related to their Kalari. Kaniyars do not have kalaris as mentioned by L K Anantha Krishna Iyer. The Kaniyar folklore include Kaniyan Koothu, Kaniyan Paatu, Padayani, etc. However Kalari Panicker has not been mentioned performing any of those. Kalari Panicker has been noted to have performed Pitichu Kali, Parishathalam Kali, Kolati. Kaniyar is mentioned to have a tradition of umbrella-making. Kalari Panicker has been known to be fencing masters from the early 12th century, and no evidences exist that they performed umbrella-making as a profession. Microhistory based research as indicated in Kerala Charitram by Mukundan Kurup, concludes that both are different communities. Hence the consolidation of two castes into one is not conclusive and the State Government of Kerala and Central Government of India also lists Kalari Panicker and Kaniyar as separate communities.

References 

Caste
Social groups of Kerala
Other Backward Classes
Indian castes